The first season of the Austrian singing competition The Masked Singer Austria premiered on 14 March 2020 on Puls 4. The panelists were Elke Winkens, Nathan Trent and Sasa Schwarzjirg. The host was Arabella Kiesbauer.

On 19 March 2020 the channel Puls 4 announced that the production would be interrupted due to the COVID-19 pandemic in Austria. The program continued on 15 September 2020.

On 13 October 2020, the Yeti (singer Nadine Beiler) was declared the winner and the Lipizzaner (singer Simone Stelzer) was the runner-up.

Panelists and host

Guest panelists
Throughout the first season, various guest judges appeared alongside Elke Winkens, Nathan Trent and Sasa Schwarzjirg as the fourth member of the judging panel, for one episode.

These guest panelists have included:

Contestants

 Carp is also known as Carp Diva

Episodes

Week 1 (14 March)

Week 2 (15 September)

Week 3 (22 September)

Week 4 (29 September)

Week 5 (6 October)

Week 6 (13 October) – Final

Group Number: "Everybody Needs Somebody to Love" by The Blues Brothers

Round One

Round Two

Reception

Ratings

References

External links
 

2020 Austrian television seasons